Palmiano is a comune (municipality) in the Province of Ascoli Piceno in the Italian region Marche, located about  south of Ancona and about  northwest of Ascoli Piceno.

Palmiano borders the following municipalities: Comunanza, Force, Roccafluvione, Venarotta.

References

Cities and towns in the Marche